In Turkey, the Directorate of State Archives was established in 1984 as an institution according to the Prime Ministry Organization Law No. 3056 to control the Republic Archives, Ottoman Archives and Departmental Documentations.

History 
In 1922, the Reservoir of Documents was established in Istanbul, affiliated to Directorate of the Board of Chief Executive Offices. Its name was changed to the Examining Office of Document Resources in 1923. In 1927, it became affiliated to the Prime Undersecretariat under the name of Managing Office of Document Resources. In May 1933, pursuant to the Organization Law, the Document Management in Ankara and the Document Resources Management in Istanbul were merged under the name of Prime Documents and Document Resources Management. In 1937, the name of the Document Resources Office was changed into the Archives Department Management. In 1943, the General Directorate of Public Archives was established.

In 1976, the Republic Archives Department was established under the Prime Ministry Undersecretariat. According to the Law No. 3473, the task of this department was to record documents related to different governmental organizations and institutions after the establishment of the republic, including the Grand National Assembly of Turkey, and to keep an archive of documents related to the Turkish War of Independence and other historical events preceding the republic era (see Ottoman Archives). On 10 July 2018, it became affiliated with the Presidential Office with the Presidential Decree No. 1 and its name was changed to the "Directorate of State Archives".

List of general managers and presidents

References

External links 
 Directorate of State Archives

Government agencies established in 1984
Government agencies of Turkey